1986 was a common year.

1986 may also refer to:

 1986 (EP), a 2007 EP by Kavinsky
 1986 (album), an album by Genie Chuo
 1986 (American TV series), an American news magazine series
 1986 (Portuguese TV series)